Giri Baale is a 1985 Indian Kannada film, directed by B. Mallesh and produced by N. Venkatesh, V. S. Shyamasundar, Smt Prabhavathi Kantharaj and K. V. Rao. The film stars Ambareesh, Geetha, Shobhana and K. S. Ashwath in the lead roles. The film has musical score by Rajan–Nagendra. The film marked Malayalam actress, Shobana in her major Kannada debut.

Cast

Ambareesh
Geetha
Shobhana as Neelaveni
K. S. Ashwath
Lokanath
Thoogudeepa Srinivas
Shakti Prasad
Mysore Lokesh
Dinesh
Musuri Krishnamurthy
Hanumanthachar
B. Mallesh
Leelavathi
Shashikala
Shyamala
Baby Rekha N.
Nagaraj
V.S. Shyamasundar in Guest Appearance
N. Venkatesh in Guest Appearance

References

External links
 

1985 films
1980s Kannada-language films
Films scored by Rajan–Nagendra
Films directed by B. Mallesh